Church & Oswaldtwistle railway station serves both the village of Church and the town of Oswaldtwistle, in Lancashire, England.

History 

Situated in the middle of Church's suburban streets, the station had fallen into disrepair, but was modernised in November 2005.

The platforms are linked via a subway, but only the Preston bound one has step free access. It is unstaffed, but like other stations on the line, it has been fitted with passenger information screens, and a public address system to provide train running information. There is a ticket vending machine available (installed in early 2018) to allow intending travellers to buy their tickets before boarding.

The local Church and Oswaldtwistle Rotary Club have adopted the station as one of their projects and regularly work to improve the station environment by carrying out cleaning and maintenance of garden areas etc.

In August 2010, a man laid on the tracks, and was hit by a train in the station. In March 2011, another man was hit by a train, although he survived. In August 2011, a train driver apprehended a man walking on tracks near the station.

Services
Monday to Saturday, there is an hourly service from Church & Oswaldtwistle towards Blackburn and Preston westbound and Accrington, Burnley Central & Colne.

On Sundays, this service is two-hourly in both directions. This is supplemented with the Sunday hourly service to Blackburn westbound, and to Burnley Manchester Road and Manchester Victoria eastbound, which passes through (but does not stop) on Mondays to Saturdays.

References

External links

Railway stations in Hyndburn
DfT Category F2 stations
Former Lancashire and Yorkshire Railway stations
Northern franchise railway stations
Railway stations in Great Britain opened in 1848